Iberia Parish is a parish located in the U.S. state of Louisiana. At the 2020 census, it had a population of 69,929; the parish seat is New Iberia.

The parish was formed in 1868 during the Reconstruction era and named for the Iberian Peninsula. It is part of the 22-parish Acadiana region of the state, with a large Francophone population. Some of its ethnic French residents had ancestors who settled here after being expelled in the 18th century by the British from Acadia in present-day Canada. Historically, it has also been a center for sugar cane cultivation and produces the most sugar of any parish in the state.

Iberia Parish is part of the Lafayette metropolitan area. The Port of Iberia has a waterway with access to the Gulf Coast.

History
Iberia Parish was created from parts of St. Martin Parish and St. Mary Parish in 1868. It was part of an effort by the Reconstruction-era government to create parishes in which there would be large Republican-majority populations, composed primarily of freedmen in those years.

This territory was part of the sugar parishes, where sugar cane plantations were developed along the waterways before and after the Civil War, dependent on labor of high numbers of enslaved African Americans before the war. Sugar cane was a lucrative commodity crop for planters. Relations between whites and blacks were troubled after the Civil War, as whites sought to dominate freedmen, by violence and intimidation if necessary.

The period after the Reconstruction era was one of increasing violence, especially at the turn of the century and into the early 20th century. In this period, the highly populated Iberia Parish had 26 lynchings of blacks by the KKK, as part of racial terrorism. This was the fifth-highest total of any parish in Louisiana, and tied with the total number of lynchings in Bossier Parish.

There was intense political factionalism in Louisiana. Iberia Parish had factions split among conservatives and those who were more moderate about the status of negros. Moderates sometimes allied with the republican creoles and whites in the parish. But in 1884 white Democrats murdered more than 20 African Americans (most of the total noted above), in a kind of political lynching, and arrested white Republicans to regain power in Iberia Parish. In contrast to northern Louisiana, residents otherwise seemed to rely more on the formal legal system, with fewer mob lynchings. But negros suffered here, making up 88 percent of the persons legally executed for violent crimes in the late 19th century.

In the late 19th century, there was often a labor shortage on the sugar plantations. Planters recruited thousands of Italian immigrants as temporary laborers, many Sicilians who had first settled in New Orleans. They were needed during the fall harvest and processing season, which extended from October to January. The Italians became part of the volatility of social relations, struggling to make their way between planters and negros workers, and competing with other workers for jobs.

The parish economy changed markedly in the 20th century after the discovery of oil. The Port of Iberia was developed into an industrial center. New types of jobs became available for African Americans.  Iberia produces the most sugar of any parish in the state.

Geography
This includes Marsh Island.

Major highways
  Future Interstate 49
  U.S. Highway 90
  Louisiana Highway 14
  Louisiana Highway 31
  Louisiana Highway 83
  Louisiana Highway 85
  Louisiana Highway 86
  Louisiana Highway 87
  Louisiana Highway 182

Adjacent parishes
 St. Martin Parish  (north, south)
 Iberville Parish  (northeast)
 Assumption Parish  (east)
 St. Mary Parish  (southeast)
 Vermilion Parish  (west)
 Lafayette Parish  (northwest)

Protected areas
The parish has both national and state protected areas within its borders.

National protected area
 Shell Keys National Wildlife Refuge

State protected areas
Part of the Attakapas Wildlife Management Area is located within Iberia Parish, as well as in St. Mary and St. Martin parishes.

Communities

Cities 

 Jeanerette
 New Iberia (parish seat and largest municipality)

Town 
 Delcambre (part)

Village 
 Loreauville

Census-designated place 
 Lydia

Unincorporated communities 
 Avery Island
 Bob Acres
 Emma
 Olivier
 Rynella

Demographics

As of the 2020 United States census, there were 69,929 people, 26,185 households, and 20,409 families residing in the parish. The 2019 American Community Survey estimated 69,830 people lived in Iberia Parish. Approximately 25.6% of the population were under 18 years of age and 51.1% of the population was female. At the census of 2000, there were 73,266 people, 25,381 households, and 19,162 families residing in the parish. The population density was 127 people per square mile (49/km2).  There were 27,844 housing units at an average density of 48 per square mile (19/km2).

In 2000, there were 25,381 households, out of which 39.50% had children under the age of 18 living with them, 53.20% were married couples living together, 17.20% had a female householder with no husband present, and 24.50% were non-families. 21.10% of all households were made up of individuals, and 8.70% had someone living alone who was 65 years of age or older. The average household size was 2.82 and the average family size was 3.28.

In the parish the population was spread out, with 30.00% under the age of 18, 9.60% from 18 to 24, 28.40% from 25 to 44, 20.60% from 45 to 64, and 11.40% who were 65 years of age or older. The median age was 33 years. For every 100 females there were 92.80 males. For every 100 females age 18 and over, there were 89.80 males in 2000.

In 2019, the parish had a median income $48,861 and mean income of $23,290. An estimated 21.9% of the parish population lived at or below the poverty line. The median income for a household in the parish was $31,204, and the median income for a family was $36,017 in 2000. Males had a median income of $32,399 versus $18,174 for females. The per capita income for the parish was $14,145.  About 20.20% of families and 23.60% of the population were below the poverty line, including 31.50% of those under age 18 and 20.20% of those age 65 or over.

At the 2000 census, the racial makeup of the parish was 65.08% White, 30.81% Black or African American, 0.31% Native American, 1.93% Asian, 0.02% Pacific Islander, 0.60% from other races, and 1.25% from two or more races. About 1.50% of the population were Hispanic or Latino of any race. Of the population, 11.99% reported speaking French or Cajun French at home, while 1.48% speak Lao and 1.29% Spanish. The 2019 census estimated determined 58.6% of the population was non-Hispanic white, 32.8% Black or African American, 0.6% American Indian or Alaska Native, 2.7% Asian, 0.1% Pacific Islander, 1.9% multiracial, and 4.3% Hispanic or Latin American of any race.

Education
Iberia Parish School System serves the parish.

Iberia parish also has several private schools. These include Catholic High New Iberia (of the Roman Catholic Diocese of Lafayette in Louisiana), Acadiana Christian School and Highland Baptist School.

Iberia Parish is in the service area of Fletcher Technical Community College and of South Louisiana Community College.

National Guard
E Company 199th Forward Support Battalion is stationed in Jeanerette, Louisiana, and B Company 2-156th is stationed in New Iberia, Louisiana. Both units have deployed twice to Iraq, 2004-5 and 2010, as part of the 256TH IBCT.

Politics

See also

 National Register of Historic Places listings in Iberia Parish, Louisiana
 William S. Patout III, Iberia Parish sugar grower

References

External links

 Iberia Parish Sheriff Department

Geology
 Heinrich, P. V., and W. J. Autin, 2000, Baton Rouge 30 x 60 minute geologic quadrangle. Louisiana Geological Survey, Baton Rouge, Louisiana.

 
Louisiana parishes
Parishes in Acadiana
Acadiana
1868 establishments in Louisiana
Populated places established in 1868